Legendary Fighter: Yang's Heroine is a 2001 Chinese costume drama produced by Chinese Entertainment Shanghai Limited in conjunction with Taiwan Television, Singapore Press Holdings and China Film Group Corporation. The plot is based on the Generals of the Yang Family legends, focusing on the women in the stories.

Cast

 Tianbo House (the Yang residence)
 Cheng Pei-pei as She Saihua, the widowed matriarch
 Cai Jing as She's widowed 1st daughter-in-law
 Wang Xinfen as She's widowed 2nd daughter-in-law
 Jin Jing as She's widowed 3rd daughter-in-law
 Wang Yu-wen as She's 4th daughter-in-law (Lady Luo), Yang Yanhui's previous wife
 Constance Song as She's 5th daughter-in-law, Yang Yande's separated wife
 Tung Ai-ling as She's 6th daughter-in-law (Princess Chai), Yang Yanzhao's wife
 Carman Lee as She's daughter and 8th child
 Feng Jiaqi (child) / Ken Chang as Yang Zongbao, Yang Yanzhao's son
 Theresa Lee as Yang Paifeng, a kitchen maid
 Xu Hongda as Yang Hong, the butler
 Andrew Lin as Yang An, Yang Hong's son

 Song Dynasty court
 Ben Wong as Yang Yanzhao, army commander, She's 6th son
 Cheung Kam-ching as Emperor Zhenzong of Song
 Zhang Han as Xiao'anzi, a eunuch
 Michelle Chia as Imperial Consort Wang, supposedly Wang Qin's 1st daughter
 Bryan Leung as Wang Qin, the grand tutor
 Guo Qiming as Wang Zhong, Wang Qin's associate
 Ko Shu-yuan as Xie Jinwu, Wang Qin's 2nd son-in-law
 Xu Min as Zhao Defang, the "Eighth Virtuous Prince"
 Han Tongshan as Kou Zhun, the chancellor

 Liao Dynasty court
 Dai Chunrong as Empress Dowager Xiao Yanyan
 Yueh Leen as the Yinjing Princess, Empress Dowager Xiao's 1st daughter
 Roger Kwok as Mu Yi, Yinjing Princess's husband (actually She's 4th son Yang Yanhui)
 Zhang Shan as Han Chang, army commander
 Wan Yeung-ming as Beimengduo, Liao Dynasty agent in Song Dynasty

 Others
 Wu Yue as Yang Yande, She's 5th son, a monk at Mount Wutai
 Sun Li as Du Jin'e, She's widowed 7th daughter-in-law that the family was unaware of
 Lu Qiqi (child) / Ning Jing as Mu Guiying, Yang Zongbao's eventual wife
 Huang Daliang as Ren Dao'an, a Taoist priest with magical powers
 Power Chan as Cheng Gang, Ren Dao'an' student
 Darren Lim as Jiang Bin, Ren Dao'an' student
 Marsha Yuan as Jiang Cuiping, Mu Guiying's junior, Jiang Bin's sister
 Tian Qiong as Pianpian, a prostitute, Xie Jinwu's lover
 Li Xiaoyan as Haitang, the brothel madam

Soundtrack

Track list
 An Affair to Remember (女兒當自強) [4:33]
 Shadow Killer (真假刺客謎) [3:58]
 Angel Hero (女將初征) [4:31]
 Killing My Son (轅門斬子) [4:59]
 Power of Love (再戰金沙灘) [2:55]
 Look Back My Home (似是故人來) [3:43]
 Hot War (巧盜鳳髮) [3:13]
 Redwood (降龍木) [4:18]
 Down to You (穆桂英招親) [3:12]
 Love Begins Here (楊八妹游春) [3:01]
 Return to Rightness (穆桂英歸宋) [3:58]
 The Rain Seems Coming (山雨欲來) [3:10]
 Visit Mother (四郎探母) [4:37]
 Broke Out (大破天門陣) [3:40]

References
Product on Yesasia.com

2001 Chinese television series debuts
Works based on The Generals of the Yang Family
Television series set in the Northern Song
Television series by Tangren Media
Television series set in the Liao dynasty
Mandarin-language television shows
Television shows set in Kaifeng
Chinese wuxia television series